Kamyshevatoye is a rural locality (a village/ selo) in Alexeyevsky District, Belgorod Oblast, Russia. The population was 383 as of 2010. There are 6 streets.

Geography 
Kamyshevatoye is located 24 km southwest of Alexeyevka (the district's administrative centre) by road. Stanichnoye is the nearest rural locality.

References 

Rural localities in Alexeyevsky District, Belgorod Oblast
Biryuchensky Uyezd